Frank B. York (about 1878 in Brooklyn, New York – February 2, 1937, in the Bronx, New York) was the President of the Brooklyn Dodgers of Major League Baseball from 1930 to 1932. He was a lawyer, whose representation of brothers Stephen and Ed McKeever led to his being handed the job after internal disagreements among the Dodgers' front office management led to a settlement imposed by the National League and Wilbert Robinson's resignation as president.

York died on February 2, 1937, of pneumonia after a week-long illness at age 59.

References

External links
Dodgers ownership history

Baseball executives
1937 deaths
Major League Baseball team presidents
Brooklyn Dodgers executives
Year of birth uncertain